Natural Symbols: Explorations in Cosmology (first published 1970) is an influential book by the British cultural anthropologist Mary Douglas. Further editions were published in 1973, 1982, 1996, 2003. It was also published in 2003 as volume 3 in Mary Douglas: Collected Works.

Theoretical innovation 
It was in Natural Symbols that Douglas introduced the "group-grid" theory, with "group" indicating how clearly defined an individual's social position is as inside or outside a bounded social group, and "grid" indicating how clearly defined an individual's social role is within networks of social privileges, claims, and obligations. The group–grid pattern was later to be refined and redeployed in laying the foundations of the cultural theory of risk.

Reviews 
Natural Symbols was reviewed by:
K. O. L. Burridge in Man, New Series, 5:3 (1970), p. 530;
David Martin in British Journal of Sociology, 21:3 (1970), pp. 343–344;
David R. Bell in The Philosophical Quarterly, Vol. 22, No. 88 (1972), pp. 280–282;
Shlomo Deshen in American Journal of Sociology, 77:1 (1971), pp. 163–166;
Martin G. Silverman in American Anthropologist, New Series, 73:6 (1971), pp. 1293–1295;
Anthony Storr, "The Ritual of Language and Vice Versa", in Chicago Tribune, June 28, 1970.

Sources 
Albert James Bergesen, "Rituals, Symbols, and Society: Explicating the Mechanisms of the Moral Order", a review essay in American Journal of Sociology, 83:4 (1978), pp. 1012–1021 (also dealing with Mary Douglas's earlier work, Purity and Danger).
Richard Fardon, Mary Douglas: An Intellectual Biography (London: Routledge, 1999), ch. 5.

External links 
2002 edition on google books. Accessed 22 March 2010.

1970 non-fiction books
Books by Mary Douglas
Anthropology books